Edwin Alexi Gómez Gutiérrez (born 4 March 1993) is a Peruvian footballer.

Club career
Gómez started his Youth career in Escuela de La Policía. He then went to Sporting Cristal, Esther Grande de Bentín and in 2008 and 2009 played for Club Andrés Campeón – ADC. In 2010, he went for trials to Platense, Tigre, River Plate and Velez Sarsfield where he stayed 6 months in Velez Sarsfield and was going to make his Reserve debut for the Argentinian Club, but got injured with a broken bone in his foot and had to go through surgery. He returned to Peru and continued his senior career playing for Hijos de Acosvinchos in the Segunda División in 2011. Then he had his first chance in the top-flight by joining León de Huánuco in January 2012. He made his Torneo Descentralizado debut on matchday one in 2–2 draw away to Alianza Lima. He finished his debut season in the Descentralizado with 21 league appearances and 1 goal.

In 2013, he became Peruvian National League Champion scoring in the penalty shootouts in Huancayo against Real Garcilaso del Cusco with Universitario de Deportes achieving the club's 26th National Title.

He also scored in Copa Libertadores 2014 against The Strongest from La Paz, Bolivia. He scored a penalty.

He was the best left winger in U20 South American Championship in 2013 scoring against Uruguay in the first match.

In the Peruvian Top Team he was in the Starting XI in the match Argentina 3 – 1 Perú in Buenos Aires in World Cup 2014 Qualifiers. He assisted Claudio Pizarro in the first goal.

Style of Play
Gomez is left footed. Mainly a left back, he can also operate as an offensive left winger, defensive and offensive central midfielder, right inverse winger or even striker #11.

Honours

Club
Universitario de Deportes 
 Torneo Descentralizado (1): 2013

References

External links
 

1993 births
Living people
Sportspeople from Callao
Peruvian footballers
Peru under-20 international footballers
Association football defenders
León de Huánuco footballers
Club Universitario de Deportes footballers
IF Brommapojkarna players
San Luis de Quillota footballers
Atlas F.C. footballers
Club de Gimnasia y Esgrima La Plata footballers
Minnesota United FC players
FBC Melgar footballers
Club Alianza Lima footballers
Universidad Técnica de Cajamarca footballers
Peruvian Primera División players
Superettan players
Chilean Primera División players
Argentine Primera División players
Liga MX players
Peruvian expatriate footballers
Expatriate footballers in Sweden
Expatriate footballers in Chile
Expatriate footballers in Mexico
Expatriate footballers in Argentina
Expatriate soccer players in the United States
Major League Soccer players
Deportivo Garcilaso players